The 1999 Challenge Cup, known as the Silk Cut Challenge Cup for sponsorship reasons, was the 98th staging of the Challenge Cup, a European rugby league cup competition. The competition ended with the final on 1 May 1999, which was played at Wembley Stadium, and was the last year the cup final was played there before the stadium was closed for redevelopment.

The tournament was won by Leeds Rhinos, who beat London Broncos 52–16 in the final, and was the club's first major silverware since 1978. The Lance Todd Trophy was won by Leroy Rivett, who had become the first player to score four tries in a Challenge Cup final.

First round

Second round

Third round

Fourth round

Fifth round

Quarter-finals

Semi-finals

Final

Leeds Rhinos : 1 Iestyn Harris 2 Leroy Rivett 3 Richie Blackmore 4 Brad Godden 5 Francis Cummins 6 Daryl Powell 7 Ryan Sheridan
8 Barrie McDermott 9 Terry Newton 10 Darren Fleary 11 Adrian Morley 12 Anthony Farrell 13 Marc Glanville
14 Marcus St Hilaire 15 Lee Jackson 16 Andy Hay 17 Jamie Mathiou
Coach: Graham Murray

London Broncos: 1 Tulsen Tollett 2 Rob Smyth 3 John Timu 4 Greg Fleming 5 Martin Offiah 6 Karle Hammond 7 Shaun Edwards
8 Steele Retchless 9 Robbie Beazley 10 Matt Salter 11 Shane Millard 12 Robbie Simpson 13 Peter Gill
14 Mat Toshack 15 Glen Air 16 Dean Callaway 17 Chris Ryan
Coach: Dan Stains

References

External links
Challenge Cup official website

Challenge Cup
Leeds Rhinos
Challenge Cup